The Old Assembly Rooms is a Grade II listed building at 9 Low Pavement, Nottingham.

History

There were also two drawing rooms and a refreshment room. The building was altered in 1776-78 by John Carr, and repaired and enlarged in 1807–08 at a cost of £1,545 raised by public subscription. The building was originally owned by the proprietors of the Grand Stand racecourse, but they sold it in November 1835 for £1,100. to the committee of the News Society, for the use and accommodation of the Conservative Party in the town and neighbourhood. Thomas Winter re-fronted the building in 1836.

In 1907 the building was converted for office use.

References

Grade II listed buildings in Nottinghamshire
Buildings and structures in Nottingham